Gibbsia is the scientific name of two genera of organisms and may refer to:

Gibbsia (apicomplexan), a genus of apicomplexans in the family Adeleidae
Gibbsia (plant), a genus of plants in the family Urticaceae